is a Japanese former gymnast and one of the most successful Olympic athletes of all time. Between 1968 and 1976 he won twelve Olympic medals, including eight gold medals.

Biography 

Katō was born in Niigata Prefecture and studied at the Tokyo Kyoiku University. He first competed in the Olympics in 1968, alongside his elder brother Takeshi. They won the team competition, with Sawao also taking gold medals in the all-around and on the floor. He placed third in the rings event.

Four years later the Japanese men's gymnastics team dominated the 1972 Olympics, taking 15 out of 21 individual medals. Katō won gold medals all-around and in the parallel bars and silvers on the horizontal bar and pommel horse. He aimed for an unprecedented third gold medal in the all-around at the 1976 Summer Olympics, but was defeated by Nikolai Andrianov. The team competition was close this time, but the Japanese defeated the Soviets by four tenths of a point, earning their fifth consecutive title. Katō closed out his Olympic career by retaining his title in the parallel bars.

Katō is one of only ten athletes to have won eight or more Olympic gold medals. He is one of the most successful male gymnasts ever at the Olympics: his eight gold and twelve overall medals are best rivaled by Nikolai Andrianov's seven gold and 15 overall, Boris Shakhlin's seven gold and 13 overall, and Takashi Ono's five gold and 13 overall. He won more Olympic gold medals than any Japanese Olympian, and is second after Ono in the total number of medals. In 2001, Katō was inducted into the International Gymnastics Hall of Fame.

As of 2010, Katō was a professor emeritus at the University of Tsukuba.

See also
 List of multiple Olympic gold medalists
 List of multiple Olympic medalists
 List of multiple Summer Olympic medalists
 List of Olympic medal leaders in men's gymnastics

References

 

1946 births
Living people
Japanese male artistic gymnasts
Olympic gymnasts of Japan
Gymnasts at the 1968 Summer Olympics
Gymnasts at the 1972 Summer Olympics
Gymnasts at the 1976 Summer Olympics
Olympic medalists in gymnastics
Academic staff of the University of Tsukuba
University of Tsukuba alumni
Olympic gold medalists for Japan
Olympic silver medalists for Japan
Olympic bronze medalists for Japan
Medalists at the 1976 Summer Olympics
Medalists at the 1972 Summer Olympics
Medalists at the 1968 Summer Olympics
Medalists at the World Artistic Gymnastics Championships